Dawnrazor is the debut studio album by English gothic rock band Fields of the Nephilim. It was released in May 1987, through record label Situation Two.

Background 
The introductory track contains a sample of the Ennio Morricone theme "Man with the Harmonica" from Sergio Leone's epic 1968 western film Once Upon a Time in the West.

Critical reception 

Dawnrazor was generally well-received, though the band and the album were often criticised for the perceived similarity to the work of the British gothic rock band The Sisters of Mercy. Trouser Press called it "an enjoyable creation, with some great songs [...], but the Sisters' influence is so strong that it tends to overshadow the Nephs' unique qualities." Dave Dickson of the British music magazine Kerrang! praises the band for the concept of "Spaghetti-metal", inspired by the characters portrayed on the screen by Clint Eastwood, but he is less warm on the execution, starting with "the plagiarising of the master musician of Spaghetti Western, Ennio Morricone" and the "truck loads of effects" used to recreate the atmosphere of the movies. For these reasons, he gave the album two different scores.

Track listing 
All tracks by Fields of the Nephilim, except "Intro" by Ennio Morricone

US LP has added "Preacher Man", "Power" and "Blue Water" singles but misses "Reanimator".

CD version has "Preacher Man" + 4 tracks from Italian "Returning to Gehenna EP" excluding title track but misses "Blue Water" which is available on "Revelations" compilation.

Personnel 
Fields of the Nephilim
 Carl McCoy – vocals
 Peter Yates – guitar
 Paul Wright – guitar
 Tony Pettitt – bass
 Alexander Wright – drums

Production
 Bill Buchanan – producer
 Iain O'Higgins – producer on "Secrets", "Power" and "The Tower"
 Fields of the Nephilim – producers on "Laura II", "Secrets", "Power" and "The Tower" 
 Martin Stansfield, Stephen Stewart – engineers
 John Fryer – mixing
 Vic Maile – mixing on "Power"
 Greg Copeland, Richard Stanley, Justin Thomas – photography

References

External links 
 

Fields of the Nephilim albums
1987 debut albums
Beggars Banquet Records albums
Situation Two albums